Paul Fishenden (born 2 August 1963) is an English former professional footballer who played in the Football League as a forward.

Honours
Crewe Alexandra
Football League Fourth Division third-place promotion winner: 1988–89

References

1963 births
Living people
Footballers from Hillingdon
English footballers
Association football forwards
Wimbledon F.C. players
Napier City Rovers FC players
Örebro SK players
Fulham F.C. players
Millwall F.C. players
Leyton Orient F.C. players
Crewe Alexandra F.C. players
Wokingham Town F.C. players
Crawley Town F.C. players
Harrow Borough F.C. players
English Football League players